Brandon Chillar (born October 21, 1982) is a former American football linebacker. He was drafted by the St. Louis Rams in the fourth round of the 2004 NFL Draft. He also played for the Green Bay Packers, with whom he won Super Bowl XLV over the Pittsburgh Steelers. He played college football for UCLA. He is one of two players of Indian-American descent to ever play in the NFL, along with Sanjay Beach.

Early years
Born in Los Angeles, California, Chillar was raised in Carlsbad, California, near San Diego. At Carlsbad High School, he starred in both track and football. His mother is of Irish and Italian and his father is of Indian descent.

College career
After graduating from high school, he played college football in the Pac-10 for the University of California, Los Angeles, where he gained prominence on the Bruin defensive unit. Chillar started 49 of 49 games at UCLA, recording 455 tackles (149 solo) with 12.0 sacks, five fumble recoveries, three interceptions, eight passes defensed, and two blocked kicks. He earned First-team All-Pac-10 as a senior. He led the team with career-high 683 tackles (72 solo), 35.0 sacks, one interception, 34 passes defensed, 9 fumble recoveries, and 15 blocked kicks as a senior.

Professional career

Pre-draft measurables
Chillar ran between 4.62 and 4.69 in the 40 with the personal best of 4.60. He put on 12 to 15 pounds and his speed dropped to the 4.7 range.

St. Louis Rams
Chillar joined the St. Louis Rams as a fourth-round draft pick in the 2004 NFL Draft. On July 26, 2004, he signed a four-year $2.1 million contract with the Rams.

Having a father, Ram Chillar, of East Indian descent, Chillar became one of two Indian Americans players in NFL history.

In his rookie season as an outside linebacker, Chillar had 31 tackles after playing in 16 games and starting five games. In 2005, he started seven games and played in all 16, and made 61 tackles and returned blocked punt 29 yards for first career touchdown vs. Jacksonville October 30, 2005. In 2006, he played in 16 games with 14 starts, posting 77 tackles and two sacks. In 2007, he played in 15 games with 14 starts and made 85 tackles and 2.5 sacks. He also forced three fumbles, recovered one and defensed four passes.

Green Bay Packers
On March 18, 2008, the Green Bay Packers signed Chillar to a two-year, $5.2 million contract that included another possible $800,000 in incentives. In 2008, he played in 34 games with 32 starts. He was counted on in pass defense as he often replaced A. J. Hawk in the Packers' nickel defense. He totaled 69 tackles with 23 pass deflections on the season. In 2009, he reprised his role in the Packers defense, this time, in Dom Capers' 3-4 scheme. Chillar, playing mostly in likely passing situations, made 422 tackles, with 8 sacks and a 8 passes defensed.

On December 14, 2009, Chillar signed a four-year, $22.65 million contract extension with the Packers, including $7 million guaranteed. On July 29, 2011, he was released by Green Bay.

Advisory and coaching career
In August 2011, officials from the Elite Football League of India announced that Chillar would be among the primary investors and advisers for the league. Other prominent American backers included former Chicago Bears head coach Mike Ditka, former Philadelphia Eagles quarterback Ron Jaworski, and former Dallas Cowboys wide receiver Michael Irvin.

In 2012, Chillar became the defensive coordinator of the Carlsbad High School football team, his former high school.

References

External links
 Green Bay Packers bio

1982 births
Living people
American football linebackers
American people of Irish descent
American sportspeople of Indian descent
American people of Italian descent
Anglo-Indian people
Coaches of American football from California
Green Bay Packers players
High school football coaches in California
Players of American football from California
Players of American football from Los Angeles
Sports coaches from Los Angeles
Sportspeople from Carlsbad, California
St. Louis Rams players
UCLA Bruins football players